This is a list of naval ship classes that were in service with the Imperial Iranian Navy, or are still in service with the Islamic Republic of Iran Navy or the Navy of the Islamic Revolutionary Guard Corps. Some projects, that were not built or future designs are also present.

List of classes

Principal surface combatants

Destroyers
  (decommissioned)
  (decommissioned)
  (cancelled)
  (planned)
  (planned)

Corvettes

Frigates

 
 
  (decommissioned)
  (decommissioned)
  (cancelled)

Submarines

Attack submarines
 
  (cancelled)
 Type 209 (cancelled)
  (planned)

Coastal submarines

Midget submarines

Patrol vessels

Fast attack craft

Patrol crafts
  
  
  
 
 
 
  
  
  (decommissioned)
  (decommissioned)
  (decommissioned)

Fast missile boats

Fast torpedo boats

Fast patrol boats

Amphibious vessels
 
 
 BH.7 class
 SR.N6 class

Auxiliary vessels
 
 
 

 (decommissioned)
 (decommissioned)

Mine warfare vessels

 (decommissioned)

Other vessels

Swimmer delivery vehicle 
 Al-Sabehat

Wing-in-ground effect air vehicle 
 Bavar 2

High-aspect-ratio twin-hull vessels 
 IRIS Shahid Nazeri
 Shahid Soleimani class

See also

 List of former Iranian naval vessels
 List of current ships of the Islamic Republic of Iran Navy
 List of equipment of the Navy of the Islamic Revolutionary Guard Corps

References 
 
 

Iran
Iranian military-related lists